Joël Robuchon (7 April 1945 – 6 August 2018) was a French chef and restaurateur. He was named "Chef of the Century" by the guide Gault Millau in 1989, and awarded the Meilleur Ouvrier de France (France's best worker) in cuisine in 1976. He published several cookbooks, two of which have been translated into English, chaired the committee for the Larousse Gastronomique, and hosted culinary television shows in France. He operated more than a dozen restaurants across Bangkok, Bordeaux, Hong Kong, Las Vegas, London, Macau, Monaco, Montreal, Paris, Shanghai, Singapore, Taipei, Tokyo, and New York City. His restaurants have been acclaimed, and in 2016 he held 32 Michelin Guide stars among them, the most any restaurateur has ever held.

Biography 
Robuchon was born in 1945 in Poitiers, France, one of four children of a bricklayer. He attended the seminary in Châtillon-sur-Sèvre (now Mauléon), Deux-Sèvres, briefly considering a clerical career. In 1960, at the age of 15, he became an apprentice chef at the Relais de Poitiers hotel, starting as a pastry chef.

After he turned 21, he joined the apprenticeship "Compagnon du Tour de France", enabling him to travel throughout the country, learning a variety of regional techniques. At the age of 29, Robuchon was appointed head chef at the Hôtel Concorde La Fayette, where he managed 90 cooks. In 1976 he won the Meilleur Ouvrier de France for his craftsmanship in culinary arts. While working as an Executive Chef and Food and Beverage manager of the Nikko hotel in Paris he gained two Michelin stars.

In 1981 he opened his own restaurant, Jamin, which holds the rare distinction of receiving three Michelin stars in the first three years of existence. In 1984, Jamin was named "Best Restaurant in the World" by International Herald Tribune. Between 1987 and 1990, he became a regular of cooking shows on French television.

In 1989, prestigious restaurant guide Gault Millau named Robuchon the "Chef of the Century". He mentored many famous chefs, including Gordon Ramsay, Eric Ripert, and Michael Caines.

In 1995, seeing many of his peers die of stress and heart attacks, Robuchon retired at the age of 50. He subsequently staged a comeback, opening several restaurants bearing his name around the world. He hosted Cuisinez comme un grand chef on TF1 from 1996 to 1999; in 2000, he hosted Bon appétit bien sûr on France 3. Through his various restaurants, including the newly awarded 3-star rating for his restaurant in Singapore, he accumulated a total of 32 Michelin Guide stars – the most of any chef in the world.

In June 2018, Resorts World Singapore stated that both the three-Michelin-starred Joel Robuchon Restaurant and the two-starred L'Atelier de Joel Robuchon would close at the end of the month.

Robuchon was a Freemason of the Grande Loge Nationale Française, but claimed it did not affect his career.

Robuchon died from cancer on 6 August 2018, a year after receiving treatment for a pancreatic tumour. He was 73.

Personal life 
Robuchon and his wife Jeanine, whom he married in 1966, had two children, son Eric Robuchon, a pedicurist and podiatrist based in Paris, and daughter Sophie Kartheiser, who manages a restaurant named La Cour d'Eymet in Dordogne with her husband, chef François Kartheiser. He also has a son Louis Robuchon-Abe (born 1988) with a Japanese woman. Louis is a wine import company's owner in Japan. Robuchon was survived by his wife, his three children and four grandchildren.

Legacy 
Robuchon has been the most influential French chef of the post-nouvelle cuisine era. Since the mid-1980s, he has been called the primus inter pares of Paris' three star chefs for his work both at Jamin and at his eponymous restaurant.

Robuchon has been known for the relentless perfectionism of his cuisine; he said there is no such thing as the perfect meal – one can always do better. He was instrumental in leading French cuisine forward from the excessive reductionism of nouvelle cuisine toward a post-modern amalgam of the nouvelle, international influences – especially Japanese cuisine – and even select traditions of haute cuisine.  In particular, his style of cooking was often seen as of celebrating the intrinsic qualities of the best, seasonal ingredients (dubbed "cuisine actuelle" by Patricia Wells in her book, "Simply French"). Drawing his inspiration firstly from the simplicity of Japanese cuisine, he led the way in creating a more delicate style respectful of natural food ingredients.

Restaurants 
Joël Robuchon restaurants are present worldwide:

Asia
Dubai – L'Atelier de Joël Robuchon
Hong Kong – L'Atelier de Joël Robuchon (3 Michelin stars), Salon de Thé de Joël Robuchon
Macau – Robuchon au Dôme (3 Michelin stars)
Shanghai – L'Atelier de Joël Robuchon (2 Michelin stars), Salon de Thé de Joël Robuchon
Taipei – L'Atelier de Joël Robuchon (2 Michelin star), Salon de Thé de Joël Robuchon
Tokyo – L'Atelier de Joël Robuchon (1 Michelin star), La Table de Joël Robuchon (2 Michelin stars), Le Chateau de Joël Robuchon (3 Michelin stars)
Europe
Bordeaux – La Grande Maison de Joël Robuchon
London – L'Atelier de Joël Robuchon (1 Michelin star), La Cuisine de Joël Robuchon (1 Michelin star)
Monaco – Restaurant de Joël Robuchon (2 Michelin stars), Yoshi (1 Michelin star)
Paris – L'Atelier de Joël Robuchon (1 Michelin star), La Table de Joël Robuchon (2 Michelin stars)
North America
Las Vegas – Joël Robuchon, L'Atelier de Joël Robuchon
Miami – L'Atelier de Joël Robuchon (2 Michelin stars)

Past locations: Bangkok, Singapore, Montreal, New York City.

Awards 
Best French Restaurant, Best Chef in Las Vegas, Las Vegas Life International Epicurean Awards
"Hot Tables", CondeNast Traveller
Five-Star Award, 2006–2011 Forbes Travel Guide
Best French Restaurant in Las Vegas, 2006–2010, Hotel Concierge Association.
The Laurent Perrier 2009 Lifetime Achievement Award at The S. Pellegrino World's 50 Best Restaurants 2009

Cookbooks 
Robuchon has published numerous cookbooks in French and English, some of which are:

Simply French: Patricia Wells Presents the Cuisine of Joel Robuchon
Tout Robuchon (published as The Complete Robuchon in English)
Joël Robuchon Cooking Through the Seasons
La Cuisine de Joël Robuchon: A Seasonal Cookbook
L'Atelier of Joël Robuchon: The Artistry of a Master Chef and His Protégés
Le Grand Larousse Gastronomique
Food and Life
My Best: Joël Robuchon
Grand Livre de Cuisine de Joël Robuchon
French Regional Food
Robuchon Facile
Le Meilleur & Le Plus Simple de Robuchon: 130 recettes
Le Meilleur & Le Plus Simple de la France: 130 recettes
Le Meilleur & Le Plus Simple de la pomme de terre: 100 recettes
Ma Cuisine Pour Vous
Cuisine des Quatre Saisons
Larousse Vegetables & Salads
Emotions Gourmandes
Les Dimanches de Joël Robuchon
Il Grande Libro di Cucina di Joël Robuchon
Best of Joel Robuchon
Bon Appétit Bien Sûr: 150 recettes à faire à la maison

See also 
 List of Michelin starred restaurants
 L%27Atelier de Joël Robuchon

References

External links 
 Le Monde de Joël Robuchon
 Guide by a fan group
 Official website of Joël Robuchon's TV show

1945 births
2018 deaths
People from Poitiers
French Roman Catholics
French Freemasons
French chefs
Officiers of the Légion d'honneur
Officiers of the Ordre des Arts et des Lettres
Officers of the Ordre national du Mérite
Commanders of the Order of Agricultural Merit
Head chefs of Michelin starred restaurants
French restaurateurs